Paracrothinium is a genus of leaf beetles in the subfamily Eumolpinae. It is known from Asia.

Species
 Paracrothinium collare Kimoto & Gressitt, 1982
 Paracrothinium consimile Chen, 1940
 Paracrothinium cupricolle Chen, 1940
 Paracrothinium latum (Pic, 1928)
 Paracrothinium rufum Medvedev, 1993

References

Eumolpinae
Chrysomelidae genera
Beetles of Asia